Escobares is a city in Starr County, Texas, United States. The population was 2,588 at the 2020 census. The city was formed in 2005 from part of the deleted Escobares CDP, and parts of Garceno, and North Escobares CDPs, and additional area. Prior to its 2005 incorporation as a city, it was a census-designated place (CDP).  The population of the CDP was 1,954 at the 2000 census.

Geography

Escobares is located at  (26.412009, –98.960138).

Escobares gained area when it became a city, giving it a total area of 2.7 square miles (7.0 km2), of which 2.6 square mile (6.7 km2) is land and 0.1 square mile (0.3 km2) (6.86%) is water.

Demographics

2020 census

As of the 2020 United States census, there were 2,588 people, 660 households, and 525 families residing in the city.

2010 census
At the 2010 census the city of Escobares had a population of 1,188.  The racial composition of the population was 98.3% white (7.2% non-Hispanic white), 1.6% from some other race and 0.1% from two or more races.  92.8% of the population was Hispanic or Latino with 92.3% identifying as being ethnically Mexican.

2000 census
As of the census of 2000, there were 1,954 people, 516 households, and 464 families residing in the CDP. The population density was 2,044.8 people per square mile (785.9/km2). There were 598 housing units at an average density of 625.8 per square mile (240.5/km2). The racial makeup of the CDP was 88.33% White, 0.15% African American, 0.26% Native American, 0.05% Pacific Islander, 9.67% from other races, and 1.54% from two or more races. Hispanic or Latino of any race were 98.72% of the population.

There were 516 households, out of which 58.3% had children under the age of 18 living with them, 66.1% were married couples living together, 20.7% had a female householder with no husband present, and 9.9% were non-families. 9.1% of all households were made up of individuals, and 6.2% had someone living alone who was 65 years of age or older. The average household size was 3.79 and the average family size was 4.05.

In the CDP, the population was spread out, with 39.3% under the age of 18, 12.3% from 18 to 24, 24.9% from 25 to 44, 17.3% from 45 to 64, and 6.1% who were 65 years of age or older. The median age was 24 years. For every 100 females, there were 96.4 males. For every 100 females age 18 and over, there were 82.7 males.

The median income for a household in the CDP was $15,884, and the median income for a family was $16,677. Males had a median income of $16,167 versus $11,298 for females. The per capita income for the CDP was $5,726. About 51.2% of the families and 50.8% of the population were below the poverty line, including 50.8% of those under age 18 and 60.9% of those age 65 or over. In 2019 the BBC reported that  62% of residents lived below the poverty line, the highest rate of any US city with more than 1,000 people according to the 2016 US Census Bureau survey.

Education

Public education in the city of Escobares is provided by the Roma Independent School District. Zoned elementary campuses include DG Garcia Elementary School (formerly Ynes B. Escobar Elementary School), Veterans Memorial Elementary School, and R. T. Barrera Elementary School. Roma High School is the district's sole comprehensive high school.

Zoned campuses include Anna S. Canavan Elementary School (pre-K), Escobar Elementary (grades K–5), Ramiro Barrera Middle School (grades 6–8), and Roma High School  (grades 9–12).

Government and infrastructure
The city opened its first fire station, a $560,000 facility, on August 2, 2011. The Texas Department of Rural Affairs provided a $531,000 block grant to help build the station.

External links
 BBC report on the city – poorest city in the USA

References

Cities in Starr County, Texas
Cities in Texas
Former census-designated places in Texas